Rauhofer is a surname. Notable people with the surname include:

Max Rauhofer (born 1990), Uruguayan football player
Peter Rauhofer (1965–2013), American DJ, remixer, and producer